Hoya gaoligongensis grows in moist evergreen broad-leaved forests between 2000 and 2400 meters above sea level and is currently found only in pristine forests. It has the characteristics of living and growing on a large tree. It is very demanding on habitats such as forest quality, humidity, temperature and humus accumulation on bark surfaces. It was first found in Longling Xiaoheishan Provincial Nature Reserve, Yunnan Province, China.

Distinction
Hoya gaoligongensis is similar with Hoya yuennanensis and Hoya globulosa. However, the phenotypic trait of leaves and flowers can be clearly distinguished from the other two plants.

References

gaoligongensis